Neobuccinum is a genus of sea snails, marine gastropod mollusks in the family Buccinidae, the true whelks.

Species
Species within the genus Neobuccinum include:

 Neobuccinum eatoni (Smith, 1875)

References

Buccinidae
Monotypic gastropod genera